The Codex Amiatinus (also known as the Jarrow Codex) is considered the best-preserved manuscript of the Latin Vulgate version of the Christian Bible. It was produced around 700 in the northeast of England, at the Benedictine Monkwearmouth–Jarrow Abbey in the Kingdom of Northumbria, now South Tyneside, and taken to Italy as a gift for Pope Gregory II in 716. It was one of three giant single-volume Bibles then made at Monkwearmouth–Jarrow, and is the earliest complete one-volume Latin Bible to survive, only the León palimpsest being older; and the oldest Bible where all the biblical canon present what would be their Vulgate texts.

It is named after the location in which it was found in modern times, Monte Amiata in Tuscany, at the Abbazia di San Salvatore and is now kept at Florence in the Biblioteca Medicea Laurenziana (Amiatino 1). 

Designated by siglum A, it is commonly considered to provide the most reliable surviving representation of Jerome's Vulgate text for the books of the New Testament, and most of the Old Testament. As was standard in all Vulgate Bibles until the ninth century, the Book of Baruch is absent as is the Letter of Jeremiah, the text of the Book of Lamentations following on from the end of Jeremiah without a break.  Ezra–Nehemiah is presented as a single book, the texts of the canonical Book of Ezra and Book of Nehemiah being continuous. Similarly the books of Samuel, Kings and Chronicles are each presented as a single book.

In 2018 the Codex Amiatinus was loaned to the British Library in London for an exhibition of Anglo-Saxon manuscripts, returning to England for the first time in 1,300 years.

Description

The symbol for it is written am or A (Wordsworth).

The Book of Psalms is provided in Jerome's third version, translated from the Hebrew, rather than in the pre-Jerome Roman Psalter then standard in English bibles, or in Jerome's second, Gallican version, that was to supplant his Hebraic Psalms in most Vulgate bibles from the 9th century onwards. By contrast with case in most of the rest of the Old Testament, the Amiatinus psalms text is commonly considered an inferior witness of Jerome's Versio juxta Hebraicum; the presence of the 'Columba' series of psalm headings, also found in the Cathach of St. Columba, demonstrates that an Irish psalter must have been its source; but the text differs in many places from the best Irish manuscripts. The New Testament is preceded by the Epistula Hieronymi ad Damasum, Prolegomena to the four Gospels.

The Codex Amiatinus qualifies as an illuminated manuscript as it has some decoration including two full-page miniatures, but these show little sign of the usual insular style of Northumbrian art and are clearly copied from Late Antique originals. It contains 1,040 leaves of strong, smooth vellum, fresh-looking today despite their great antiquity, arranged in quires of four sheets, or quaternions. It is written in uncial characters, large, clear, regular, and beautiful, two columns to a page, and 43 or 44 lines to a column. A little space is often left between words, but the writing is in general continuous. The text is divided into sections, which in the Gospels correspond closely to the Ammonian Sections. There are no marks of punctuation, but the skilled reader was guided into the sense by stichometric, or verse-like, arrangement into cola and commata, which correspond roughly to the principal and dependent clauses of a sentence. From this manner of writing the script is believed to have been modeled upon the Codex Grandior of Cassiodorus, but it may go back, perhaps, even to St. Jerome.

History

Originally three copies of the Bible were commissioned by Abbot Ceolfrith in 692. This date has been established as the double monastery of Monkwearmouth–Jarrow secured a grant of additional land to raise the 2000 head of cattle needed to produce the vellum. Bede was most likely involved in the compilation. In 716, Ceolfrid accompanied one copy, the Codex Amiatinus, intended as a gift to Pope Gregory II, but he died en route to Rome on 29 September 716 at Langres, Burgundy. The book later appears in the ninth century in Abbazia di San Salvatore, Monte Amiata, in the March of Tuscany (hence the description "Amiatinus"), where it is recorded in a list of the Abbey's relics dated 1036, describing it as being an Old and New Testament "written in the hand of the blessed Pope Gregory" . It remained in the San Salvatore Monastery until 1786 when it passed to the Laurentian Library in Florence.

The dedication page had been altered and the principal librarian to the Laurentian, Angelo Maria Bandini suggested that the author was Servandus, a follower of St. Benedict, and that it had been produced at Monte Cassino around the 540s. This claim was accepted for the next hundred years, establishing it as the oldest copy of the Vulgate, but scholars in Germany noted the similarity to 9th-century texts. In 1888, Giovanni Battista de Rossi established that the Codex was related to the Bibles mentioned by Bede. This also established that Amiatinus was related to the Greenleaf Bible fragment in the British Library. Although de Rossi's attribution removed 150 years from the age of the Codex, it remains the oldest complete text of the Vulgate.

As the primary source of the Vulgate, the manuscript was of particular importance to the Catholics during the Counter-Reformation. Protestant translations derived from the original language of the Scriptures, but the Latin text of the Amiatinus was earlier than any then-known Hebrew manuscript, making it a "major piece of propaganda in the battle for textual precedence". In 1587 Pope Sixtus V demanded the book be sent to Rome where it was consulted for a new papal edition of the Bible, the Sixtine Vulgate; although in the event, little or no use was made of its readings in either the Sistine or subsequent Sixto-Clementine official Vulgate editions, whose editors rather preferred later medieval Vulgate texts and editions now known to have been heavily corrupted by non-Vulgate readings.

In view of the many accumulated corruptions in all published editions of the Vulgate so far, the Oxford University Press accepted in 1878 a proposal from classicist John Wordsworth (later Bishop of Salisbury) to produce a new critical edition of the Vulgate New Testament. This was eventually published as Nouum Testamentum Domini nostri Iesu Christi Latine, secundum editionem sancti Hieronymi in three volumes between 1889 and 1954; the Codex Amiatinus being a primary source for the entire text; which also followed this manuscript in presenting the text in sense lines, cola et commata without any other indication of punctuation. In 1907 Pope Pius X commissioned the Benedictine monks in Rome to prepare a critical edition of Jerome's Vulgate, entitled Biblia Sacra iuxta latinam vulgatam versionem, which eventually emerged as a counterpart Old Testament to the Oxford New Testament, following largely the same critical principles, and according similar primary status to the Codex Amiatinus text (other than for the Psalms); and similarly deriving its layout, cola et commata from Amiatinus.

See also
 List of New Testament Latin manuscripts
 Celt (tool) – a famous mistake in most Vulgates, not found in this copy
 Ceolfrid Bible – almost certainly a surviving portion of one of the other two single-volume Bibles ordered made by Ceolfrid for the double monastery of Monkwearmouth–Jarrow.
 Codex Fuldensis

References

Further reading 
 
 
 
 
 
 
 
 
 
 The City and the Book: International Conference Proceedings, Florence, 2001.
 Alphabet and Bible: From the Margins to the Centre. Paper at Monte Amiata, 2009. https://web.archive.org/web/20090803165921/http://www.florin.ms/AlphabetBible.html
 Contains link to facsimile project, as well.

External links 

 Codex Amiatinus: Complete images through the World Digital Library
 Florence, Biblioteca Medicea Laurenziana, Amiat. 1, bibliography
 Image of the codex, folio 950
 British Library blogpost
 
 The Cambridge History of the Bible, Cambridge University Press 2008, pp. 117–119, 130.
 More information at Earlier Latin Manuscripts.

Hiberno-Saxon manuscripts
Illuminated biblical manuscripts
Vulgate manuscripts
8th-century biblical manuscripts